Zhao Ping (born 31 March 1965) is a Chinese para table tennis player. He won three medals at the 2008, 2012, and 2016 Summer Paralympics respectively.

Zhao has been paralyzed since 1999, when he was involved in a car accident.

References

1965 births
Living people
Table tennis players at the 2016 Summer Paralympics
Table tennis players at the 2012 Summer Paralympics
Table tennis players at the 2008 Summer Paralympics
Paralympic medalists in table tennis
Medalists at the 2008 Summer Paralympics
Medalists at the 2016 Summer Paralympics
Medalists at the 2012 Summer Paralympics
Chinese male table tennis players
Paralympic gold medalists for China
Paralympic bronze medalists for China
Paralympic table tennis players of China
Table tennis players from Heilongjiang
Sportspeople from Qiqihar
Table tennis players at the 2020 Summer Paralympics
FESPIC Games competitors